The third cabinet of Prime Minister Marián Čalfa was in power from 27 June 1990 to 2 July 1992. It originally consisted of Civic Forum (OF), Public Against Violence (VPN), Christian Democratic Movement (KDH) and Communist Party of Czechoslovakia (KSČ). Prime minister was member of VPN. KSČ left government in October 1990. When OF was dissolved in 1991, it was replaced by Civic Movement (OH) and Civic Democratic Party (ODS). It was known as "Cabinet of National Sacrifice."

Government ministers

References

Government of Czechoslovakia
Civic Forum
Civic Democratic Party (Czech Republic)
Christian Democratic Movement
Civic Democratic Alliance
Communist Party of Czechoslovakia
Civic Movement